Felix Beckeman (born in November 21, 1991) is a Swedish athlete that competes in mountain biking with a specificity in cross-country cycling. He was the winner of a gold medal in the European Mountain Bike Championships in 2012.

In 2017, he won the Four-Cross World Championships in Val di Sole Trentino, Italy.

International Wins

References 

1991 births
Living people
Swedish male cyclists